Paddy Dowdall (born 1982) is an Irish hurler who currently plays as a midfielder for the Westmeath senior team.

Dowdall joined the Westmeath team straight from the minor ranks in 2001, however, he didn't become a regular until the 2003 National League. Since then he was won two Christy Ring Cup medals and one National League (Division 2) medal.

At club level Dowdall is an All-Ireland and Leinster medalist in the intermediate grade with Clonkill. He has also won four senior county club championship medals. Also plays Gaelic football for St Lomans GAA, Mullingar. Altogether, Dowdall holds 14 senior club championship medals; 9 with Clonkill and 5 with St Lomans.

References

1983 births
Living people
Clonkill hurlers
Westmeath inter-county hurlers